Trela is a surname of Polish origin which derives from trel – an area in the forest where felled timber is located or trill. Notable people with the name include:
Dariusz Trela (born 1989), Polish soccer player
Elżbieta Trela-Mazur (born 1947), Polish historian
Jerzy Trela (born 1942), Polish actor
Stanisław Trela (1892–1950), Polish architect

References